Cecil Wilson may refer to:

 Cecil Wilson (bishop of Bunbury) (1860–1941), Anglican Bishop of Melanesia, and cricketer
 Cecil Wilson (politician) (1862–1945), British pacifist Labour Party Member of Parliament
 Cecil Wilson (bishop of Middleton) (1875–1937), Anglican Bishop of Middleton
 Cecil Wilson (journalist) (1909–1997), English journalist